Keda or KEDA may refer to:
Keda (fly), a genus of flies
Keda, Georgia, a small town in Ajaria, Georgia
Keda Municipality, Georgia
KEDA (AM), a radio station (1540 AM) licensed to San Antonio, Texas, U.S.A.
 Keda, a  character in the Gormenghast series by Mervyn Peake
 Kedah Regional Development Authority (KEDA), a federal agency in the Ministry of Rural Development in Malaysia

See also 
 Kedah, state in Malaysia
 Keida, Israeli outpost in the West Bank
 Kida (disambiguation)